Dwarf cuscus (Strigocuscus) is a nocturnal, arboreal marsupial genus in the family Phalangeridae found only in Sulawesi (the largest island in Wallacea) and some of its surrounding small offshore islands. Due to the unique biogeography of Sulawesi giving sub-regions of endemism, it is likely that there are several different species or subspecies as yet to be described by science.  So far, the genus contains the following species:

 Sulawesi dwarf cuscus (Strigocuscus celebensis)
 Banggai cuscus (Strigocuscus pelengensis)

References

Marsupial genera
Possums
Taxa named by John Edward Gray
Taxonomy articles created by Polbot